Tangaroasaurus is an extinct genus of squalodontid whale from the Miocene of New Zealand. It contains a single species, Tangaroasaurus kakanuiensis. Similar to Basilosaurus and its close relative Squalodon, it was originally thought to be a species of marine reptile. Parts of the Holotype are presumably lost. Its name comes from Tangaroa, the Maori god of the sea, while the suffix -saurus comes from the Latin word for reptile, the group that Tangaroasaurus was originally placed in.

The type fossil was found in a grey clay deposit at All Day Bay and consists of a jaw bearing a few teeth, measuring  each. The original describer of the type specimen, William Blaxland Benham, described it as a reptile, either a dinosaur such as Megalosaurus or an late surviving ichthyosaur. The genus was described as an odontocete cetacean in 1979 by R. E. Fordyce.

The status of the genus as a cetacean remains under discussion.

Fossils known from the same geological formation, the All Day Bay formation and Gee Greensand Formation, include an unnamed species of Squalodelphinidae and a species of Prosqualodon.

See also 

Squalodon
Evolution of cetaceans
Basilosaurus

References

Prehistoric cetacean genera
Miocene mammals of Oceania
Prehistoric monotypic mammal genera
Fossil cetaceans misidentified as reptiles
Fossils of New Zealand
Fossil taxa described in 1935